Sisir Ghosh is a former Indian professional footballer who played as a striker for local Kolkata clubs Mohun Bagan and East Bengal. He also represented the India national team.

International career
Ghosh made his competitive debut for the India national team on 21 March 1985 in a 1986 FIFA World Cup qualifier against Indonesia. He started as India were defeated 2–1.

Honours

India
 South Asian Games Gold medal: 1985, 1987

References

External links
Profile at the indianfootball.de website
Profile at the 11v11 website

Living people
People from Hooghly district
Indian footballers
Association football forwards
Aryan FC players
East Bengal Club players
Mohun Bagan AC players
Calcutta Football League players
Footballers from West Bengal
India international footballers
Year of birth missing (living people)
Footballers at the 1986 Asian Games
Asian Games competitors for India
South Asian Games medalists in football
South Asian Games gold medalists for India